Kozhukovo is a rural locality (a village) in Arkhangelskoye Rural Settlement, Sokolsky District, Vologda Oblast, Russia. The population was 14 as of 2002.

Geography 
Kozhukovo is located 14 km northwest of Sokol (the district's administrative centre) by road. Arkhangelskoye is the nearest rural locality.

References 

Rural localities in Sokolsky District, Vologda Oblast